Alex Bowen is an American freestyle skier. He won a silver medal in aerials at the FIS Freestyle Ski and Snowboarding World Championships 2015.

References

Year of birth missing (living people)
Living people
American male freestyle skiers